Hanson (also known as Junior Marvin's Hanson) were a British-based rock band formed by Junior Hanson in 1973 and were signed to Emerson, Lake and Palmer's record label Manticore. Their debut album Now Hear This, was released in 1973 and featured Bobby Tench. At the beginning of 1974, Junior Marvin disbanded the existing line-up and reformed the band for the recording of a funk rock album Magic Dragon, which was released later that year.

Now Hear This

Track listing
Side One
"Traveling Like a Gypsy" - 6:15
"Love Knows Everything" - 3:08
"Mister Music Maker" - 4:27
"Catch That Beat" - 3:48
"Take You into My Home" - 3:11
Side Two
"Gospel Truth" - 5:03
"Rain" - 5:10
"Smokin’ to the Big 'M'" - 9:53

Credits
Junior Hanson - guitar and lead vocals; backing vocals on "Love Knows Everything" and "Take You Into My Home"; bass guitar on "Rain"
Jean Roussel - electric piano, organ, clavinet, Mini-Moog synthesizer; piano on "Gospel Truth"
Clive Chaman - bass guitar on all tracks except for "Love Knows Everything" and "Rain"
Conrad Isidore - drums on all tracks except for "Love Knows Everything"

Additional Personnel
Jimmy Thomas - superstring; backing vocals on "Take You Into My Home", "Rain" and "Smoking to the Big 'M'"
Rebop Kwaku Baah - congas
Bobby Tench - backing vocals on "Love Knows Everything", "Gospel Truth" and "Rain"; guitar on "Catch That Beat"
Godfrey McLean - drums and backing vocals on "Love Knows Everything"
Delisle Harper - bas guitar on "Love Knows Everything"
Chris Wood - flute on "Mister Music Maker"
Ken Cumberbatch - piano on "Catch That Beat"

Magic Dragon

Track listing
Side one
"Rocking Horseman" — (John Burns) — 3:32
"Modern Day Religion" — (Junior Hanson, Ken Cumberbatch) — 3:10
"Down into the Magic" — (Hanson, Cumberbatch) — 5:26
"Rock Me Baby" — (B.B. King, Joe Josea) — 3:55
Side two
"Love Yer, Need You" — (Hanson, Neil Murray, Glen LeFleur, Brother James) — 4:59
"Boy Meets Girl" — (Cassandra) — 3:05
"American Beauty Rose" — (Hanson, Cumberbatch) — 3:05
"Looking at Tin Soldiers" — (Hanson) — 3:44
"Magic Dragon" — (Hanson, Cumberbatch) — 2:58

Credits
Junior Hanson — electric guitar, lead vocals; acoustic guitar (track 3)
Neil Murray — bass
Glen LeFleur — drums; percussion (track 1)
Brother James — congas; percussion (tracks 1, 3, 6, 7)
Cassandra — backing vocals (track 2)
Marlo Henderson — electric guitar (tracks 1, 2, 6)
Andre Lewis — clavinet (tracks 1, 8), organ  (tracks 3, 6)
The Big 'M' — voice of the company sergeant (track 8)

Discography
Now Hear This Manticore (1973)
Magic Dragon Manticore (1974)
Now Hear This Ork/Cherry Red  (2007) re-release

References

External links
Junior Marvin Hanson press release

Musical groups established in 1973
English rock music groups